The 1967 Minnesota Twins finished 91–71, tied for second in the American League with the Detroit Tigers. The Twins had a one-game lead on the Red Sox with two games remaining in Boston, but lost both games. A total of 1,483,547 fans attended Twins games, the second highest total in the American League.

Offseason 
 December 3, 1966: Bernie Allen and Camilo Pascual were traded by the Twins to the Washington Senators for Ron Kline.

Regular season 
With a second-place finish in 1966, the Twins appeared poised to contend in 1967. However, at the end of May, they were in sixth place (in a ten team league), with 20 wins and 22 losses. One week later, owner Calvin Griffith fired manager Sam Mele, who had guided the club to a pennant in 1965. He was replaced by Cal Ermer, who had been managing the Twins AAA farm club in Denver.

On May 21, César Tovar became the first Twin to have a four-extra-base day hitting.

The Twins continued to play .500 ball until late June, when Minnesota reeled off an eight-game winning streak. At the All-Star break, they had risen to third place, two and one half games behind the league leading Chicago White Sox.

On July 26, pitcher Jim Merritt set a club record, pitching the first thirteen innings (and taking a no-decision) in an 18-inning win over the New York Yankees.  Facing 46 batters, he allowed just two runs.

Four Twins made the All-Star Game: first baseman Harmon Killebrew, who led the team with 44 HR and 113 RBI; second baseman Rod Carew, the AL Rookie of the Year; outfielder Tony Oliva, and pitcher Dean Chance, a 20-game winner in 1967.

After a brief slump in late July, the Twins began the month of August by winning 15 of 20 games, including a three-game sweep of the White Sox, which put them in first place on August 13. From that point on, they remained in first place, or never more than two games out of it.

Twins pitcher Dean Chance threw the club's second no-hitter on August 25.  Earlier in the month, he pitched a perfect five innings on August 6 -- but the game was called for rain and ultimately not counted.  On July 28, Chance got his first hit as a Minnesota Twin after going 0 for 53 since arriving from the California Angels.

On September 14, outfielder Walt Bond died of leukemia. Bond had been diagnosed with the disease several years earlier, but it had gone into remission. He started the season with the Twins and played in 10 games before being removed from the active roster. His final game was on May 7.

With one day left in the regular season, Minnesota was tied for first place with the Boston Red Sox, with the Detroit Tigers just a half game behind them. The two first place teams were scheduled to play one another in Fenway Park, while the Tigers were to meet the California Angels in a doubleheader. Dean Chance threw five scoreless innings and the Twins scored unearned runs in the first and third inning to take a 2–0 lead. However, in the sixth inning, things fell apart for the Twins as the Red Sox took advantage of four consecutive singles, two wild pitches, and an error to score five runs. Minnesota mustered only one more run, and lost the game and their chance for a second league championship in three years. The Tigers won their first game, but lost their second, and Boston earned the American League pennant.

Utilityman César Tovar set an American League record by playing in 164 games this season.  Pitcher Jim Kaat won his sixth Gold Glove Award.

Season standings

Record vs. opponents

Notable transactions 
 June 6, 1967: 1967 Major League Baseball draft
Mike Sadek was drafted by the Twins in the 5th round.
Steve Luebber was drafted by the Twins in the 13th round.

Roster

Player stats

Batting

Starters by position 
Note: Pos = Position; G = Games played; AB = At bats; H = Hits; Avg. = Batting average; HR = Home runs; RBI = Runs batted in

Other batters 
Note: G = Games played; AB = At bats; H = Hits; Avg. = Batting average; HR = Home runs; RBI = Runs batted in

Pitching

Starting pitchers 
Note: G = Games pitched; IP = Innings pitched; W = Wins; L = Losses; ERA = Earned run average; SO = Strikeouts

Other pitchers 
Note: G = Games pitched; IP = Innings pitched; W = Wins; L = Losses; ERA = Earned run average; SO = Strikeouts

Relief pitchers 
Note: G = Games pitched; W = Wins; L = Losses; SV = Saves; ERA = Earned run average; SO = Strikeouts

Farm system 

LEAGUE CHAMPIONS: Auburn, St. Cloud

Notes

References 
Player stats from www.baseball-reference.com
Team info from www.baseball-almanac.com

Minnesota Twins seasons
Minnesota Twins season
Minnesota Twins